Galvez is an unincorporated community in Ascension Parish, Louisiana, United States, ten miles (16 km) southeast of Baton Rouge. It is surrounded by the larger unincorporated community of Prairieville, with which it shares the 70769 ZIP code.

Historic Galveztown

In 1778, Loyalists from Canewood, an English settlement on the eastern banks of the Amite river petitioned Count Bernardo de Gálvez, the colonial Governor of Louisiana and viceroy of New Spain (future Mexico) for permission to settle on the Spanish side of this river to escape torment from supporters of the American Revolution.  (As per one old map, the head of this group went by the name "Grey.").  Permission was granted, and in honor of the Spanish Governor, the refugees named their settlement "Galveztown".

Gálvez sent settlers from the Canary Islands, known as Isleños, to Galveztown in 1779, hoping to establish a military stronghold against the British in West Florida, who controlled nearby Baton Rouge at the time. The plans for the town called for it to be built in traditional Spanish villa layout including a military fort or presidio, although evidence of the town's actual layout, including the fort, is limited.

From the start, diseases such as smallpox and scabies spread in the area. Floods, hurricanes, and droughts destroyed crops year after year. Due to the somewhat remote location from New Orleans, supplies were expensive to obtain (in the pre-steamboat era).  By the end of 1779, Galveztown lost much of its importance as a military post after the British, who were fighting the rebel colonies on the East coast, lost Baton Rouge, Mobile, and Pensacola to Spain.  (Four years later, Spain had control over all of Florida once again, with the Treaty of Paris.)

The town began to decline, as diseases, natural disasters, and scarcity of supplies took their toll.  In 1785, the population was down to 242. By 1804, only 28 families and fewer than 25 slaves remained.  The following year, survivors of Galveztown settled in Baton Rouge, in what is now known as the Spanish Town neighborhood.  Because of the Louisiana Purchase, the inhabitants wished to live in an area controlled by New Spain, which Baton Rouge was for several years.

Although the Spanish fort, streets, and homes remained as ruins in Galveztown for well over a century, no effort was made to preserve the site.  Today, only a state historical marker honoring the Canary Islanders remains to mark the spot.

From 2008 through 2010, preliminary archaeological work was undertaken on the site of Galveztown.  In the summer of 2011, a field school offered by LSU was conducted.

Modern Galvez
The modern location of Galvez is to the southwest of the original settlement, at an area later homesteaded by farmers and ranchers during the latter half of the 19th Century.

Later sold to developers and now is dotted with production homes with no character. Modern day homesteaders. TD.com

Geography

External links

In Search of Galveztown <--Broken link Oct 2015. 
Digging Into History <--Broken link Oct 2015.
Cajuns, Creoles, Planters and Pirates
 "Excavation Uncovers Galveztown Artifacts" October 2009 article in The Gonzales Weekly Citizen of Gonzales, Louisiana.

Populated places established in 1778
Unincorporated communities in Louisiana
Unincorporated communities in Ascension Parish, Louisiana
Baton Rouge metropolitan area
Louisiana Isleño communities
1778 establishments in New Spain